Karl Ernst Thomas de Maizière (born 21 January 1954) is a German politician of the Christian Democratic Union (CDU) who served as Federal Minister of the Interior from 2009 to 2011 and 2013 to 2018, as well as Federal Minister of Defence from 2011 to 2013. He previously served as Head of the Chancellery and Federal Minister for Special Affairs in the First Merkel cabinet from 2005 to 2009. Since 2009, he has been a member of the Bundestag for Meißen.

Along with Ursula von der Leyen and Wolfgang Schäuble, De Maizière was one of only three ministers to have continuously served in Chancellor Angela Merkel's cabinets from 2005 until 2018. Together with Von der Leyen, he was widely looked on as a possible future successor to Merkel. Before his appointment to the federal cabinet, he served as a minister in the state government of Saxony, including as chief of staff to the Minister-President, State Minister of Finance and State Minister of Justice.

Early life and education

Maizière was born in Bonn to the later Inspector general of the Bundeswehr, Ulrich de Maizière. He graduated at the Aloisiuskolleg in Bonn and studied law and history at the Westfälische Wilhelms-Universität in Münster and the University of Freiburg. He passed his first state examination in law in 1979 and his second 1982, earning his Doctor of law (Dr. jur.) in 1986.

He belongs to a noble family originally from Maizières-lès-Metz who, as Huguenots, had fled France for asylum in Prussia in the late 17th century. The Maizière family still attended French-language schools and Huguenot churches in Berlin until the beginning of the 20th century. His cousin Lothar de Maizière is also a CDU politician and was the last, and only democratically elected, Premier of the German Democratic Republic, who later served as Federal Minister of Special Affairs in the government of Helmut Kohl until his resignation following the discovery of his affiliation with the GDR secret service.

Political career

Early career in state politics
Maizière worked for the governing mayor (prime minister) of West Berlin (Baron Richard von Weizsäcker and Eberhard Diepgen), before becoming a member of the West German team in the negotiations on German reunification. After 1990 he worked with re-establishing democratic structures in states that were part of the former German Democratic Republic. He became secretary of state at the ministry of culture of the state of Mecklenburg-Vorpommern in November 1990. From December 1994 to 1998 he was chief of staff of the Chancellery of Mecklenburg-Vorpommern.

He served as the chief of the Saxon Chancellery from 1999 to 2001, with the rank of cabinet minister. As chief of staff to Kurt Biedenkopf, he helped negotiate the special Solidarity Pact designed to finance the reconstruction of the former East Germany. From 2001 to 2002 he served as the minister of finance of Saxony, from 2002 to 2004 minister of justice, and from 2004 to 2005 as minister of the interior.

Chief of Staff at the Federal Chancellery (2005–2009)
On 17 October 2005, Maizière was nominated as a member of the Federal Government as chief of the Chancellor's office and as federal minister for special affairs in the first Merkel cabinet. He took office on 22 November 2005, after Merkel's election as Chancellor by the Bundestag. In his capacity as chief of staff of the chancellery, he also functioned as deputy president of the German Institute for International and Security Affairs (Stiftung Wissenschaft und Politik).

Between 2007 and 2009, Maizière was one of 32 members of the Second Commission on the modernization of the federal state, which was established to reform the division of powers between federal and state authorities in Germany.

Federal Minister of the Interior (2009–2011)
He was elected in Meißen. In the negotiations to form a coalition government following the 2009 federal elections, Maizière led the CDU/CSU delegation in the working group on taxes, national budget, and financial policy; with Hermann Otto Solms of the FDP as joint chairman. Following the formation of the Second Merkel cabinet, he took office as Federal Minister of the Interior.

As Interior Minister, Maizière long played down security worries, but he abruptly changed course late in 2010, giving warnings that there were serious indications of terror attacks being prepared in Europe and the United States. In July 2010, he outlawed the Internationale Humanitäre Hilfsorganisation (IHH), a charity registered in Frankfurt, because of its alleged links to the militant Palestinian organization Hamas, arguing that "the IHH has, under the cover of humanitarian aid, supported Gaza Strip-based so-called social associations which are attributable to Hamas, for a long period of time and to a considerable financial extent." That same month, Maizière announced that Germany would take over and release two prisoners of the Guantanamo Bay detention camp.

In October 2010, Maizière and Transport Minister Peter Ramsauer banned arrivals of all air cargo from Yemen, after the German authorities had been tipped off by a foreign intelligence service that there were explosives inside a U.S.-bound parcel trans-shipped at Cologne Bonn Airport.

Minister of Defence (2011–2013)

On 2 March 2011, Merkel announced that Maizière was to take over from Karl-Theodor zu Guttenberg, the federal defence minister who had resigned from office the previous day. On 3 March, he was formally appointed to this post. He held the defence ministry portfolio until 17 December 2013.

Signaling one of the biggest shake-ups in decades for the German military, in 2011 Maizière unveiled plans to reduce troop numbers, cut bureaucracy, and eliminate duplication inside the Federal Ministry of Defence. Under these proposals, the army was to be turned into a wholly professional force.

On the occasion of the sixtieth anniversary of the diplomatic relations between German and India, Maizière participated in the first joint cabinet meeting of the two countries’ governments in Delhi in May 2011. On 7 June 2011, he attended the state dinner hosted by President Barack Obama in honor of Chancellor Angela Merkel at the White House.

Speaking to the German newspaper  Frankfurter Allgemeine Zeitung in February 2012, Maizière said that an Israel Defense Forces strike on Iran's nuclear facilities was "highly unlikely" to succeed, and noted that such a strike would cause "obvious political damage." During a meeting in Berlin in March 2012, he warned Israel’s Defense Minister Ehud Barak against an attack on Iran, joining other Western countries which were applying heavy international pressure on Israel to prevent it from attacking Iran’s nuclear facilities.

In 2012, Maizière told a gathering of army reservists that he considered the U.S. strategy of using drones for targeted killings a "strategic mistake". According to the online news edition of the German public television broadcaster ARD, Maizière had said he thought it was unwise to have U.S. commanders direct such attacks from their bases in the United States.

Second appointment as Federal Minister of the Interior (2013–2018)

In the negotiations to form a government following the 2013 federal elections, Maizière led the CDU/CSU members in the working group on foreign affairs, defense, and development cooperation; his co-chair from the SPD was Frank-Walter Steinmeier. On 17 December 2013, he was appointed as Federal Minister of the Interior for a second time. In addition, he co-chairs the EPP Justice and Home Affairs Ministers Meeting, alongside Esteban González Pons.

On 23 February 2014, Bild am Sonntag reported that Maizière and other members of the government, as well as leading figures in business, were under NSA surveillance. The newspaper report, quoting an unnamed NSA official, said the U.S. was particularly interested in the interior minister "because he is a close aide of Merkel, who seeks his advice on many issues and was rumored to be promoting his candidacy for the post of NATO secretary-general." From the beginning of 2015, the left-wing opposition and media commentators have repeatedly criticized de Maizière over his record as chief of staff in 2005–09, and over what he knew about Germany's Federal Intelligence Service (BND) helping U.S. agencies to spy on European firms such as the defence manufacturer Airbus.

In late 2014, Maizière proposed a law according to which the government would have the power to withdraw the identity cards of potential foreign fighters and replace them with another form of identification; this was meant to allow government agencies to prevent Germans from leaving the country to join groups such as Islamic State in Iraq and Syria. In May 2015, he banned Yuruyus, a leftist-terrorist newspaper published by the Turkish extremist group DHKP-C, and had his ministry order raids across the country in connection with this ban.

By late 2015, amid the European migrant crisis, de Maizière urged that Europe should set a limit on the number of refugees it takes in and seek out those most clearly entitled to protection. His critics say he failed to fight for more staff and budget for the Federal Office for Migration and Refugees (BAMF), which falls under his ministry, despite years of warnings from German states that the agency was being overwhelmed with asylum applications. In an effort to better detect the identities of migrants arriving from Syria, Afghanistan and other trouble spots, de Maizière later spearheaded the introduction of an identity card for refugees.

In 2016, Maizière banned the neo-Nazi group "White Wolves Terror Crew" (WWT) following raids on 15 properties across the country as worries were growing about a rise in right-wing sentiment after the influx of more than a million migrants the previous year.

In January 2016, Maizière participated in the first joint cabinet meeting of the governments of Germany and Turkey in Berlin.

Later career
Since leaving government in 2018, Maizère has been serving on the Committee on Finance. In addition to his work in parliament, he has been teaching constitutional law at the University of Leipzig.

Ahead of the Christian Democrats’ leadership election in 2018, de Maizière publicly endorsed Annegret Kramp-Karrenbauer to succeed Angela Merkel as the party’s chair.

Since 2019, de Maizière has been serving as chairman of the Deutsche Telekom Foundation. Also in 2019, he was appointed by the Federal Ministry of the Interior, Building and Community to serve on the committee that oversaw the preparations for the 30th anniversary of German reunification.

In 2020, de Maizière was appointed by NATO Secretary General Jens Stoltenberg to co-chair (alongside A. Wess Mitchell) a group of experts to support his work in a reflection process to further strengthen NATO’s political dimension.

In May 2020, de Maizière announced that he would not stand in the 2021 federal elections but instead resign from active politics by the end of the parliamentary term.

Other activities
 German Evangelical Church Assembly, Member of the Presidium
 Memorial to the Murdered Jews of Europe, Member of the Board of Trustees
 Moritzburg Festival, Member of the Board of Trustees
 National Paralympic Committee Germany, Member of the Board of Trustees
 Safety in Ski Sport Foundation (SIS), Member of the Board of Trustees
 ZEIT-Stiftung, Member of the Board of Trustees (since 2018)
 German Forum for Crime Prevention (DFK), Ex-Officio Member of the Board of Trustees (2013-2018)

Recognition
 2006 – Knight Grand Cross of the Order of Merit of the Italian Republic 
 2007 – Royal Norwegian Order of Merit 
 2009 – Grand Cross of the Ordem do Mérito
 2009 – Order of Merit of the Federal Republic of Germany

Personal life
Maizière is married to Martina de Maizière, with whom he has three children. He is a Protestant.

References

Publications

External links

|-

|-

|-

|-

1954 births
Defence ministers of Germany
German Lutherans
German untitled nobility
Interior ministers of Germany
Living people
Thomas
Politicians from Bonn
University of Freiburg alumni
University of Münster alumni
Ministers of the Saxony State Government
Heads of the German Chancellery
Members of the Bundestag for Saxony
Commanders Crosses of the Order of Merit of the Federal Republic of Germany
Members of the Bundestag 2017–2021
Members of the Bundestag 2013–2017
Members of the Bundestag 2009–2013
Members of the Bundestag for the Christian Democratic Union of Germany